The Telangana State Board of Intermediate Education (TSBIE), is a Board of education in Telangana, India. It was established in 2014. It is located at Nampally, Hyderabad.

The board regulates and supervises the system of intermediate education in Telangana State. It executes and governs various activities that include devising of courses of study, prescribing syllabus, conducting examinations, granting affiliations to colleges arnd, providing direction, support and leadership for all educational institutions under its jurisdiction.

Honourable Minister of the State for Secondary Education acts as chairman and secretary to Government, Secondary Education as vice-chairman of the board. The secretary of I.A.S. Rank acts as the chief executive of the board.

Functions
 To prescribe syllabus and text books.
 To grant affiliation to the Institutions offering Intermediate Courses in the State
 To lay down regulations for the administration of the Junior Colleges
 To prescribe qualifications for the Junior Lecturers
 To cause academic inspection of Junior Colleges
 To process results and to issue certificates
 Sanction of new colleges
 Issue of eligibility and equivalency certificates to continue further studies
 To prepare the lessons for KU Band Mana TV for telecast

It has a two-tier structure – head office at state level and regional offices at 10 
districts.

Aims and objectives of intermediate education 

To make intermediate education accessible to all sections of the society.
To lay special emphasis on the Rural, Tribal, Socially under privileged sections of the society.
To strengthen girl's Education by improving their enrolment in the Colleges.
To monitor and supervise all junior colleges in the state.
To regulate the functioning of Private Aided Colleges to optimize the utilization of Grants of Grants in aid.
To provide quality education even to the remote villages through Tele-Education through Mana TV.
To make Education a tool of social and economic emancipation through Vocationalisation of Education.
Shift of focus from academics to marketable skills, by introducing professional and specialized courses in emerging areas such as Computer Science, Graphics, and Tourism etc.
Bring vocational education to centre-stage and to train students in practical and problem-solving skills.
Develop infrastructure to facilitate education to disadvantaged groups in backward and remote areas.
Provide Teacher Training.
To impart Teacher Training / Refresher Courses to update the knowledge skills of the lecturers.
To facilitate an interface with Industries and establish Linkage to ensure employment opportunities for Vocational Students.
To revamp and re-structure the Vocational Curriculum from time to time to cater to the changing needs of the society.
To promote vocational education by diverting a majority of students from general strength to vocational courses to make them self-reliant and gain employment.

Examination
Examination is one of the most important functions of the board. Every year a large number of students appears in Telangana Intermediate Examination for 1st Year (Junior) / Class 11 and 2nd Year (Senior) Class 12 under the two courses schemes – Regular & Vocational. Every year, TS Intermediate Examination has to be conducted in March/April

The Telangana Intermediate Public Advanced Supplementary when you will conduct we want a date to prepare exams. Optional subjects are not given best of the both in the re-examination but the latest marks are taken as final

Pattern
The Intermediate Public Examination is being conducted since 1978–79 both at the end of 1st year course and at the end of 2nd year course. Earlier the Public Examination was only at the end of 2nd year. The candidates are examined in Part-I English, Part-II Second Language and Part-III Group subjects for 500 marks in 1st year and 500 marks in 2nd year in Arts and commerce Group, 475 marks in HEG group and 470 marks in 1st year and 530 marks in 2nd year in MPC group, and 440 marks in 1st year and 560 Marks in 2nd year for the Bi.P.C. group. The percentage of pass marks in each paper is 35. The division in which the candidates are placed is decided on the basis of their passing all the papers in the 1st year and in the 2nd year.

Syllabus
The Board of Intermediate Education, Telangana, Hyderabad is offering a multitude of academic programmes. With a view to give greater impetus to the academic aspects of the board, a separate academic wing called "Educational Research and Training Wing" was created. The board enjoys the prerogative right of prescribing textbooks of two year Intermediate course.

The board offers the following subjects

 Part I   – English;
 Part II  – Second Languages (Telugu, Hindi, Sanskrit, Urdu, Arabic, French, Tamil, Kannada, Oriya and Marathi);
 Part III – Optional Subjects (Mathematics, Physics, Chemistry, Botany, Zoology, Commerce, Economics, Civics, History, Public Administration, Geography and Geology);
 Modern Language Subjects (English, Telugu, Hindi and Urdu);

The syllabus of language subjects and optional subjects is structured by concerned Subject Committees constituted by the Board. The committees also undertake a revision of syllabus and its updates keeping the changes and current trends in view.

See also
 Telangana Board of Secondary Education

References
TS Inter Results 2022 Inter 1st, 2nd Year Result Link tsbie.cgg.gov.in

State agencies of Telangana
Education in Hyderabad, India
State secondary education boards of India
2014 establishments in Telangana
Government agencies established in 2014